The California State Transportation Agency (CalSTA) is a state cabinet-level agency responsible for transportation-related departments within the state. The agency was created under Governor Jerry Brown in 2013 after the previous Business, Transportation and Housing Agency's portfolio underwent reorganization.

David S. Kim became the third Secretary of the California State Transportation Agency (CalSTA) on July 1, 2019, following his appointment by Governor Gavin Newsom in April 2019.

Organization 
CalSTA consists of the following transportation-related entities:

 Board of Pilot Commissioners (BOPC)
 California Highway Patrol (CHP)
 California Transportation Commission (CTC)
 Department of Motor Vehicles (DMV)
 California Department of Transportation (Caltrans)
 California High-Speed Rail Authority (CHSRA)
 New Motor Vehicle Board (NMVB)
 Office of Traffic Safety (OTS)

References

External links 
 California State Transportation Agency (CalSTA) Secretary
 California State Transportation Agency (CalSTA) Official Website
 Board of Pilot Commissioners for the Bays of San Francisco, San Pablo,& Suisun (BOPC) Official Website
 California Highway Patrol (CHP) Official Website
 California Transportation Commission (CTC) Official Website
 Department of Motor Vehicles (DMV) Official Website
 Department of Transportation (Caltrans) Official Website
 High-Speed Rail Authority (HSRA) Official Website
 Office of Traffic Safety (OTS) Official Website